The Most Relaxing New Age Music in the Universe is a two-disk album of new-age music produced by Kin-Kou Music under Savoy Label Group and first released on January 11, 2005. Each disk contains 12 tracks arranged and performed by various artists. The album reached number six in top New Age album charts in 2005, and was on the Billboard charts in that genre for 40 weeks. It was followed by several more albums: More of the Most Relaxing New Age Music in the Universe (July 2005), The Ultimate Most Relaxing New Age Music in the Universe (June 2006), and The Best of the Most Relaxing New Age Music in the Universe (October 2012). Each contained music by many of the same artists and was produced under the same label.

Track listing

References 

2005 compilation albums
Savoy Records albums